Julián Simón Sesmero (born 3 April 1987) is a Spanish motorcycle racer. He is best known for winning the 2009 125cc World Championship.

Career

125cc World Championship
Born in Villacañas, Toledo, Spain, Simón began his racing career racing for Honda in the 2002 Grand Prix motorcycle racing season at the Spanish Grand Prix. In 2003 he raced for Malaguti before switching to Aprilia in 2004 and KTM in 2005. He won the 2005 125cc British Grand Prix.

250cc World Championship
In 2007 he raced in the 250cc class for the Repsol Honda team, before riding a KTM in 2008.

Return to 125cc
In 2009 he signed with the Mapfre Aspar team to compete in the 125 class. He famously celebrated winning a race a lap before the race finished, allowing himself to be overtaken.  He eventually finished fourth. He was dominant at the subsequent Sachsenring race, dominating both wet qualifying and the dry race. This set the tone for a dominant season in which he clinched the title by overtaking closest rival Bradley Smith on the final lap at Phillip Island. He then also beat Smith to win the final two races of the year.

Moto2 World Championship
For 2010 he stepped up to the new Moto2 class with Mapfre Aspar, initially on an RSV chassis but switching to Suter after the first two rounds. He scored his first podium – and his team's first podium – in the class at the French round at Le Mans, moving into fourth place in the championship standings.

Career statistics

Grand Prix motorcycle racing

By season

By class

Races by year
(key) (Races in bold indicate pole position; races in italics indicate fastest lap)

Superbike World Championship

Races by year
(key) (Races in bold indicate pole position; races in italics indicate fastest lap)

References

External links

 

1987 births
Living people
Sportspeople from the Province of Toledo
Spanish motorcycle racers
250cc World Championship riders
125cc World Championship riders
Moto2 World Championship riders
Superbike World Championship riders
125cc World Riders' Champions